Edwardes Lake is a recreational waterbody in the Melbourne, Australia, suburb of Reservoir, formed by the damming of Edgars Creek at Edwardes Street. it is surrounded by Edwardes Lake Park.

Edwardes Lake was formed in 1888 as a private enterprise by construction of an embankment across the creek. The facility included boat sheds and refreshment rooms while sporting events were held on the lake. A  tramway was proposed to connect Heidelberg and Coburg running past the lake, but the collapse of the land boom ended the project. the embankment was later partly washed away in floods. 

In 1914 Thomas Dyer Edwardes donated 34 acres of land to the City of Preston for the creation of a park. The Preston council purchased another 12 acres to add to the park. Carlo Catani, the Chief Engineer of the Public Works Department was approached to provide a plan for laying out the park. The Reservoir Progress Association fenced the parkland and planted over 700 trees. The official opening was on Saturday July 29 1916, presided over J. G. Membrey, M.L.A. the Mayor Cr C. Stanlake, Mr Henty on behalf of Mr Edwardes and J.S. McFadzean representing the Reservoir Progress Association. Mrs Membrey, Mrs Stanlake, Mrs McFadzean and Mrs Rae each planted a tree on the day. 

A memorial avenue was proposed to be planted, but may never have been carried out, however, a new concrete weir and spillway was funded in 1919 by a Repatriation grant, presumably with returned servicemen providing the labour, and an Armistice Memorial stone was inset into the weir. The new work was officially opened on 3 April 1920 by Brigadier-General Brand. The improvements allowed swimming to be officially permitted, the Preston Rowing Club to be formed and the Preston Lifesaving Club to demonstrate swimming and lifesaving techniques between 1919 and 1939.

References

Parks in Melbourne
Lakes of Melbourne
City of Darebin